Eremochelis oregonensis is a species of windscorpion in the family Eremobatidae.

References

Solifugae
Animals described in 2005